Lindsey Ferrentino is an American contemporary playwright and screenwriter.

Career 
Ugly Lies the Bone was a New York Times Critic's Pick and played a sold-out, extended run at Roundabout Theatre before being produced at The National Theatre in London in the 900 seat Lyttleton Theatre. In The New York Times review of Ugly Lies the Bone, Charles Isherwood wrote that Ferrentino is "a brave playwright of dauntless conviction whose unflinching portraits are hard to come by outside of journalism." Deadline Hollywood described Ugly Lies the Bone as, "clearly the work of a young talent with plenty ahead of her. It’s timely, compelling and as current as you could want; brava to a playwright who focuses on the combat experiences of a woman." The Observer described it as, "raw and inescapably moving. A play of small moments that hide big emotions." Ferrentino received the 2016 Kesselring Prize for Ugly Lies the Bone.

In 2018, Amy and the Orphans, premiered at Roundabout Theatre Company and was called “barrier breaking” in the New York Times. Featuring American Horror Story'''s Jamie Brewer, Amy and the Orphans is the first Off-Broadway (or Broadway) show to have an actor with Down syndrome in a leading role. In the New York Times review of Amy and the Orphans, Brantley wrote that Ferrentino "possesses a muscular empathy which seeks to enter the minds of people for whom life is often a struggle of heroic proportions." Ferrentino, Jamie Brewer, and Eddie Barbanell received the Catalyst Awards Entertainment Industry Excellence Award for Amy and the Orphans.,

Also in 2018, This Flat Earth ran at Playwrights Horizons. The New York Times wrote that This Flat Earth is "Ferrentino's most daring play to date, with profound and essential subjects. She is bravely attempting to contextualize 21st-century horrors within the sort of existential framework in which Thornton Wilder and Edward Albee specialized."

In December 2018, The Year to Come opened at La Jolla Playhouse and was a Critic's Pick by the San Diego Tribune. According to the San Diego Tribune, "The rewards of Lindsey Ferrentino's captivating new play should be the last thing you'd want to pass up. The world-premiere La Jolla Playhouse work proves a funny and probing exploration not just of one extended Florida family's journey, but of the course of our country over two eventful, sometimes traumatic decades. That scale of domestic epic is lot to take on. Doing so in reverse brings the piece to a whole different level of storytelling technique — almost like writing a theatrical palindrome. But the sharp-witted and acutely observant Ferrentino pulls it off beautifully. The diversity of this crew — in political beliefs, religious backgrounds and more — becomes a source of both gutting conflict and hard-won bonds, and it’s fascinating, as the play spools backward, to see what led to the sense of a tentative detente we see in the first scenes."

Ferrentino's first film, Not Fade Away, as of March 2019, is in development at Annapurna Pictures, produced by David O. Russell and John Krasinski, starring Emily Blunt.

In 2021, it was announced that Ferrentino would write and direct Amy, a film adaptation of her stage play Amy and the Orphans, for Netflix with Aggregate Films attached to produce.

 Style 

Ferrentino is known for writing small character led stories that live within larger national narratives. The New York Times'' wrote that Ferrentino "possesses a muscular empathy which seeks to enter the minds of people for whom life is often a struggle of heroic proportions" and called her "a dramatist willing to wrestle with overpowering contemporary subjects."

Awards and honors 
Ferrentino's awards and honors include the 2016 Kesselring Prize, Laurents/Hatcher Citation of Excellence, ASCAP Cole Porter Playwriting Prize, Paul Newman Drama Award, 2015 Kilroys List, finalist for the Susan Smith Blackburn Prize, the Catalyst Awards Entertainment Industry Excellence Award, NYU Distinguished Young Alumna Award, nominated for the Outer Critics Circle John Gassner Award, and is the only two-time finalist for the Kendeda Playwriting Prize.

Personal 
Lindsey is the daughter of comedian/magician, John Ferrentino, and engaged to actor, Ralf Little. She is also a cousin of Chester Kallman.

References 

Year of birth missing (living people)
Living people
21st-century American dramatists and playwrights
American women dramatists and playwrights
21st-century American women writers
Hunter College alumni
Tisch School of the Arts alumni